Four jointed box 1 is a protein that in humans is encoded by the FJX1 gene.

Function

The protein encoded by this gene is the human ortholog of mouse and Drosophila four-jointed gene product. The Drosophila protein is important for growth and differentiation of legs and wings, and for proper development of the eyes. The exact function of this gene in humans is not known.

References

Further reading